Abraham Hyman Feder (July 27, 1908, Milwaukee, Wisconsin – April 24, 1997, Manhattan, New York) was an American lighting designer. He is regarded as the creator of lighting design for the theatre and was the country's leading consultant in architectural and urban lighting.

The lights at Rockefeller Center and the Empire State Building were turned off for one hour in Feder's honor after his death.

References

External links
 
Abe H. Feder lighting records and papers, circa 1930s–1990s.Held by the Department of Drawings & Archives, Avery Architectural & Fine Arts Library, Columbia University.
The Springer Opera House collection of Abe Feder lighting designs, 1932-2004, held by the Billy Rose Theatre Division, New York Public Library for the Performing Arts

1908 births
1997 deaths
American lighting designers
Federal Theatre Project people
People from Manhattan
Artists from Milwaukee